Jordan Tannahill is a Canadian author, playwright, filmmaker, and theatre director.

His novels and plays have been translated into twelve languages, and honoured with a number of prizes including two Governor General's Literary Awards. His debut novel, Liminal, was honoured with France's 2021 Prix des Jeunes Libraires. His second novel, The Listeners was a Canadian bestseller, and was shortlisted for the 2021 Giller Prize.

Tannahill has been described as "the enfant terrible of Canadian Theatre" by Libération and The Walrus, "one of Canada's most extraordinary artists" by CBC Arts, and "widely celebrated as one of Canada’s most accomplished young playwrights, filmmakers and all-round multidisciplinary artists" by the Toronto Star. In 2019, CBC Arts named Tannahill as one of sixty-nine LGBTQ Canadians, living or deceased, who has shaped the country's history.

Early life

Tannahill was born and raised in Ottawa, where he attended Canterbury High School. He moved to Toronto at the age of eighteen, and began making short films and staging experimental plays, often with non-traditional collaborators like night-shift workers, frat boys, preteens, and employees of Toronto's famed Honest Ed's discount emporium.

Theatre and performance

Tannahill's plays frequently explore the nature of belief, queer identity, power relations, and the body as a political subject. His work has been performed across North America and Europe, particularly in Germany, where several of his plays are in state theater repertory.

He received the Governor General's Award for English-language drama in 2014 for Age of Minority: Three Solo Plays, and again in 2018 for his plays Botticelli in the Fire & Sunday in Sodom. His play Concord Floral was a finalist for the award in 2016.  He has been nominated for five Outstanding New Play Dora Mavor Moore Awards, winning in 2013 for his live-streamed monologue rihannaboi95, and in 2015 for Concord Floral.
 
In 2017, Tannahill's play Late Company transferred to London's West End. In the same year, his virtual reality performance Draw Me Close, co-produced by London's National Theatre and the National Film Board of Canada, premiered at the Venice Biennale. His play for young performers, Is My Microphone On?, commissioned for the 2020 Theater der Welt festival by the Düsseldorfer Schauspielhaus, has been produced by dozens of youth theatre companies internationally, including as part of the 2023 National Theatre Connections festival. 

Tannahill's work in contemporary dance includes choreographing and performing with Christopher House in Marienbad for the Toronto Dance Theatre in 2016; and writing the text for Xenos in 2018, and Outwitting the Devil in 2019, two shows by choreographer Akram Khan, which have toured internationally to venues including Sadler's Wells Theatre, Festival d'Avignon, and the Lincoln Center for the Performing Arts. Now (newspaper) listed both Marienbad and Xenos as Top 10 dance shows of the 2010s decade.

Tannahill's production of Sheila Heti's play All Our Happy Days Are Stupid, which he directed with collaborator Erin Brubacher, premiered in 2014 at Videofag, more than a decade after Heti first began the script. Heti's struggle to write the play is one of the central plot-lines in her bestselling novel How Should a Person Be?. The production, which featured original songs by Dan Bejar, was remounted at The Kitchen in New York City in 2015.

Tannahill's book of essays on theatre, Theatre of the Unimpressed: In Search of Vital Drama, first published in 2015, was called "essential reading for anybody interested in the state of contemporary theatre and performance" by The Globe and Mail. In 2022, Playbill listed the book as one of fourteen essential books on theatre.

Novels

Liminal

Liminal is a work of autofiction which follows the character Jordan as he reckons with the nature of consciousness and the abject, precipitated by the sight of his mother's sleeping - or possibly dead - body. In her review of the novel, Martha Schabas of The Globe and Mail wrote "Tannahill's lushly intelligent debut... captures something illuminating and undefinable about the present moment; it speaks in the code and cadences of the late 2010s and paints an incisive portrait of the demographic we call millennial", and compared it to the work of authors Ben Lerner, Rachel Cusk and Karl Ove Knausgaard. In Le Devoir, Anne-Frédérique Hébert-Dolbec called the novel "a prodigious odyssey that tests the limits of reason and materiality." Liminal won the 2021 Prix des Jeunes Libraires.

The Listeners

The Listeners follows Claire Devon, a woman whose life and beliefs are irrevocably altered after she starts hearing The Hum. The book made the Canadian national bestsellers list, and was shortlisted for the 2021 Giller Prize. In their citation, the Giller jury called the novel "a masterful interrogation of the body, as well as the desperate violence that undergirds our lives in the era of social media, conspiracies, isolation and environmental degradation." The story forms the basis of an opera by composer Missy Mazzoli and librettist Royce Vavrek, which premiered at the Norwegian National Opera in 2022.

Videofag

In 2012, in collaboration with his then-partner William Ellis, Jordan founded and ran Videofag, an alternative arts space operated out of a defunct barbershop in Toronto's Kensington Market. The space doubled as the couple's home and became an influential hub for counterculture in the city, until its closure in 2016.

Political views

Tannahill is an anti-monarchist, and has written about the need for Canada to sever ties with the British Crown. He is also a critic of Brexit.

On November 23, 2018, Tannahill read the entirety of Judith Butler's Gender Trouble over nine hours outside the Hungarian Parliament Building in protest of Hungarian Prime Minister Viktor Orbán's decision to revoke accreditation and funding for gender studies programs in the country.

On April 4, 2019, Tannahill and three collaborators staged a protest action during high tea at The Dorchester Hotel. The action was in response to Brunei's proposed introduction of laws that make homosexual sex and adultery punishable by stoning to death. The Dorchester Collection is a luxury hotel operator owned by the Brunei Investment Agency. Video documentation of the protest action, and Tannahill's forceful removal from the hotel, went viral soon after it was posted online.

Bibliography

Fiction 
The Listeners, 2021
Liminal, 2018

Plays 
Is My Microphone On?, 2021
Declarations, 2018
Botticelli in the Fire, 2016 
Sunday in Sodom, 2016
Concord Floral, 2014
Late Company, 2013
rihannaboi95, 2013
Peter Fechter: 59 Minutes, 2013
Post Eden, 2010
Get Yourself Home Skyler James, 2010

Non-fiction 
The Videofag Book, 2018 
Theatre of the Unimpressed: In Search of Vital Drama, 2015

References

External links 

Suburban Beast

21st-century Canadian dramatists and playwrights
Artists from Ottawa
Artists from Toronto
Canadian theatre directors
Canadian video artists
Canadian multimedia artists
Film directors from Ottawa
Film directors from Toronto
Canadian gay artists
Canadian LGBT dramatists and playwrights
LGBT film directors
LGBT theatre directors
Canadian gay writers
Writers from Ottawa
Writers from Toronto
Living people
Governor General's Award-winning dramatists
1988 births
Canadian male dramatists and playwrights
21st-century Canadian male writers
Gay dramatists and playwrights
21st-century Canadian LGBT people